Khuan Phra Railway Halt is a railway halt located in Falami Subdistrict, Pak Phayun District, Phatthalung.

Train services 
 Local No. 445/446 Chumphon-Hat Yai Junction-Chumphon
 Local No. 447/448 Surat Thani-Sungai Kolok-Surat Thani
 Local No. 451/452 Nakhon Si Thammarat-Sungai Kolok-Nakhon Si Thammarat
 Local No. 455/456 Nakhon Si Thammarat-Yala-Nakhon Si Thammarat
 Local No. 463/464 Phatthalung-Sungai Kolok-Phatthalung

References 
 
 

Railway stations in Thailand